Dogs in Space is a 1986 Australian film set in Melbourne's "Little Band" post-punk music scene in 1978. It was directed by Richard Lowenstein and starred Michael Hutchence as Sam, the drug-addled frontman of the fictitious band from which the film takes its name.

Plot 
Dogs in Space centres on a group of young music fans sharing a house in the inner Melbourne suburb of Richmond. Sam (Michael Hutchence) and Tim (Nique Needles) are the key members of a band called Dogs in Space, and share a house with a variety of social misfits, including Sam's girlfriend Anna (Saskia Post), a university student called Luchio (Tony Helou) and a transient and apparently nameless teenager known only as The Girl (Deanna Bond).

The film's minimal plot traces the day-to-day existence of the characters, particularly the relationship between Sam and Anna, and is largely made up of a sequence of party scenes involving live music and drug use. In between, there are trips to Ballarat (at the time, the closest town to Melbourne with a 24-hour convenience store) and humorous encounters with an aggressive neighbour (Joe Camilleri) and one character's fast-talking, chainsaw-wielding uncle (Chris Haywood), who simply turns up one afternoon with his family (the baby in this scene is Lowenstein's niece Robyn). There is also a minor incident in which the characters burn some rubbish in a plan to claim it as a piece of Skylab for a local radio station. In the end, the group's dysfunctional and hedonistic lifestyle claims a victim when Anna dies from a heroin overdose. Footage of Sputnik 2 is intercut with the narrative, focused largely on Laika (the first dog in space), and can also be seen on television in the background of several scenes.

Cast
 Michael Hutchence as Sam 
 Saskia Post as Anna 
 Nique Needles as Tim 
 Deanna Bond as The Girl 
 Tony Helou as Luchio 
 Chris Haywood as Chainsaw Man
 Peter Walsh as Anthony 
 Laura Swanson as Clare
 Hugo Race as Pierre
 Alannah Hill as Anna's girlfriend
 Edward Clayton-Jones as Nick

Production

The script was based on Lowenstein's personal experiences of living in a shared house in Melbourne in the late-70s. Prior to making the film, Lowenstein had made a series of promotional clips for songs from the INXS album The Swing and wrote the lead role with singer Michael Hutchence in mind. Funds were raised through the Burrowes Group. The production company was Central Park Films Pty Ltd (Lowensteins' production company)

The central character Sam is based on Sam Sejavka from the band The Ears, with whom Lowenstein lived in the 1970s. Chuck Meo, who plays a drummer in the movie, also lived with the pair. The house, at 18 Berry Street, Richmond, was the same house Lowenstein and Sejavka shared and was rented from its new owners and modified at considerable expense for the film. Lowenstein wrote himself out of the film and several of his exploits were attributed to the character Tim (Nique Needles). Sejavka has a brief cameo in a party scene as a character called Michael. Sejavka was upset by the fictionalisation of parts of his life, saying, "Even though it's an interesting time that should be documented, I find it hard to believe Richard could do this to his friends. It's just Richard's version of what happened. It's not the correct version."

Soundtrack album 
The soundtrack album was released on Chase Records in February 1987 (CLPX14), featuring several tracks from reformed "little bands" and other contemporary tracks of the time.

The album came in two versions: a censored version in a white sleeve with the band name "Thrush & the Cunts" bowdlerised to "Thrush and the C**ts" and possibly-offensive song vocal tracks removed, and an "R"-rated version in a black sleeve with all band names in full, movie dialogue between the songs, and all vocal tracks in full. The album's liner notes were written by Clinton Walker.

Chase Records went out of business soon after and, despite much effort, the record has never been reissued and has remained unavailable since. It is now a collector's item, commanding high prices. It was only available on LP and cassette and was issued on CD – at least the censored version appeared on discount bins in shopping malls in Lisbon, Portugal, somewhere around 1996–1997.

The Hutchence tracks were his second official solo recordings, after releasing a single in 1982 titled "Speed Kills" from the soundtrack to the film Freedom, and his first with Ollie Olsen. They would later collaborate on the Max Q recordings.

Side One:
 "Dog Food" (Iggy Pop)
 "Dogs In Space" (Michael Hutchence)
 "Win/Lose" (Ollie Olsen)
 "Anthrax" (Gang of Four)
 "Skysaw" (Brian Eno)
 "True Love" (Marching Girls)
 "Shivers" (Boys Next Door)
Side Two:
 "Diseases" (Thrush & the Cunts)
 "Pumping Ugly Muscle" (The Primitive Calculators)
 "Golf Course" (Michael Hutchence)
 "The Green Dragon" (Michael Hutchence)
 "Shivers" (Marie Hoy and friends)
 "Endless Sea" (Iggy Pop)
 "Rooms For The Memory" (Michael Hutchence)

Charts

Box office
Dogs in Space grossed $367,351 at the box office in Australia. The movie's box-office prospects were affected by being given an R rating by the OFLC. It was re-classified MA15+ for subsequent DVD and Blu-ray releases.

Home media
Dogs in Space was released on DVD by Umbrella Entertainment in September 2009. The DVD is compatible with all region codes and includes special features such as the original theatrical and Director's cut trailers, various audio commentaries, a featurette titled We're Livin' on Dog Food, the making of Dogs in Space, rehearsal vision, a screen test, behind the scenes, still galleries, interviews and short films.

In March 2010, Umbrella Entertainment released the film on Blu-ray.

See also
 Melbourne in film
 Cinema of Australia
 List of Australian films

References

External links 
 
 
 Dogs in Space at Oz Movies
 Dogs in Space rewatched – Michael Hutchence in a couch-crashing classic
 Friday Dogs in Space, 30 years on – a once maligned film comes of age
 The Dogs in Space house (MichaelHutchence.com)
 Dogs In Space at the National Film and Sound Archive
 Michael Hutchence (Rarebird)
 Googlemap view of the Pelaco sign, from 18 Berry Street, Richmond, the Dogs in Space house

1987 films
Australian drama films
Films shot in Melbourne
Films set in Melbourne
Punk films
Films set in 1978
Films set in the 1970s
Michael Hutchence
Films about heroin addiction
1986 drama films
1980s English-language films
Films directed by Richard Lowenstein